Surkovo is a rural locality (a village) in Yugskoye Rural Settlement, Cherepovetsky District, Vologda Oblast, Russia. The population was 239 as of 2002. There are 2 streets.

Geography 
Surkovo is located 37 km southeast of Cherepovets (the district's administrative centre) by road. Tolmachevo is the nearest rural locality.

References 

Rural localities in Cherepovetsky District